The Baker Rocks are a spur-like rock exposure lying  west of Wood Bay and  north of Mount Melbourne, on the coast of Victoria Land. The feature was mapped by the United States Geological Survey from surveys and from U.S. Navy air photos, 1955–63, and was named by the Advisory Committee on Antarctic Names in honor of Billy-Ace Baker, Radioman, McMurdo Station Winter-Over Party in 1963, 1967, 1971, and 1975; Summer Support Expeditions, 1976–1980.

References 

Rock formations of Victoria Land
Borchgrevink Coast